Lupinus dalesiae is a species of lupine known by the common name Quincy lupine. It is endemic to California, where it is known from the northernmost slopes of the Sierra Nevada. This is an erect perennial herb up to half a meter tall. The herbage is coated in white hairs. The inflorescence bears whorls of yellow flowers roughly a centimeter long which yield rough-haired legume pods 2 or 3 centimeters in length.

References

External links
Jepson Manual Treatment
Photo gallery

dalesiae
Endemic flora of California
Flora without expected TNC conservation status